Evansville Central High School, also known as Central High, is a public high school on the north side of Evansville, Indiana. It is the oldest high school in continuous operation west of the Allegheny Mountains. It was established in 1854 as Evansville High School. The name was changed to Central High School in 1918 when FJ Reitz High School was built.

Central moved to its current location on the far north side of Evansville in the early 1970s. It is sometimes called "Vanderburgh Central" because of its location near the geographic center of Vanderburgh County, in addition to its status as the county's oldest high school.  For many years, it was the northernmost high school in the Evansville Vanderburgh School Corporation; it was four miles northwest of Evansville North High School. However, with the completion of the new North High School campus in northern Vanderburgh County, geographic correctness was restored to the name.

Academics 
Central High School received an "A" as its final letter grade for school accountability.

Notable alumni
 Andy Benes (born 1967), Major League Baseball player
 Lowell Galloway (1921–1979), professional basketball player
 Lee H. Hamilton (born 1931), U.S. Democratic Representative, Indiana 9th Congressional District
 Aaron Patzer, entrepreneur and founder of Mint.com personal financial management service
 Lloyd Winnecke (born 1960), Mayor of Evansville

References

External links 
Central High School Home Page
Evansville Vanderburgh School Corporation

High schools in Southwestern Indiana
Schools in Evansville, Indiana
Public high schools in Indiana
Educational institutions established in 1854
Southern Indiana Athletic Conference
1854 establishments in Indiana